HMS Doris was an  protected cruiser built for the Royal Navy in the mid-1890s.

Construction
HMS Doris was one of nine Eclipse-class cruisers built in the years 1896-99, which were the direct successor to the Astraea class. They were larger in size and displacement, and received stronger armor and armor with a similar speed to their predecessors.

HMS Doris had a displacement of 5690 t (5600 long tones) at an overall length of 113.7 m, width of 16.3 m and draft of 6.25 m. The ship was driven by two triple-cylinder vertical triple expansion steam engines, supplied by 8 coal-fired boilers, which moved a pair of propellers. The engines reached 8000 horsepower, giving a top speed of 18.5 knots. The normal stockpile of coal was 550 tons, and at maximum capacity the ship could take almost twice as much fuel at 1075 tons. The initial crew of the ship consisted of 393 officers and sailors.

The cruiser was initially armed with five single-arm 152 mm (6 inch ) guns, six 120 mm (4.7 inch) guns, six three-pound (47 mm) guns, and three 18-inch (450 mm) torpedo tubes. After the modernization of 1903-1905, the armament of the ship was as follows: eleven 152 mm guns, nine twelve-pound guns (76 mm), seven three-pound guns (47 mm) and three 450 mm torpedo launchers. During the First World War, the armament was limited to nine 152 mm guns, four 76 mm guns and one 47 mm gun, leaving torpedo armament unchanged. The deck armor had a thickness of 38 to 76 mm (1.5 to 3 inches) with the command tower having a thickness up to 152 mm. Main artillery pieces were protected by 76 mm thick casings.

Service history

Under the command of Captain R. C. Prothero, she was flagship of Vice-Admiral Sir Robert Harris when he was Commander-in-Chief, Cape of Good Hope Station in South Africa 1898-1900.
In 1899 at least one of HMS Doris'''s QF  guns was mounted on an improvised field carriage and used as a field gun in the Second Boer War. The gun used at Magersfontein was known as Joe Chamberlain. Captain Prothero, known as 'Prothero the Bad', was a man of violent temper who terrified his officers and crew alike.

She paid off at Devonport in May 1901, when, to honour her crew, the men of the other ships in the harbour spontaneously manned yards and sides and gave a salute.

After a refit, she was on 4 June 1902 commissioned into the Channel Squadron with the crew of HMS Arrogant. Captain Frederick Robert William Morgan was appointed in command. She took part in the fleet review held at Spithead on 16 August 1902 for the coronation of King Edward VII, and visited Souda Bay, Crete for combined maneuvers with other ships of the Channel and Cruiser squadrons the following month. In October she visited Tetouan.

In April 1911 she was on station with the Atlantic Fleet at Gibraltar under the command of Captain Michael Henry Hodges.

First World War
When the First World War began in August 1914, Doris was serving with the 11th Cruiser Squadron of the Home Fleet, and her Captain was Frank Larken On 5 August, Doris captured a German merchant ship.

By November 1914, Doris was cruising off the West Coast of Ireland. On 7th of that month she was ordered to proceed to Alexandria to form part of the Allied force opposing Turkey. She was ordered to patrol the Syrian coast, looking out for enemy ships and shore installations, and to "exercise general pressure."

On 15 December Doris was lying off the Syrian coast near Beersheba when she spotted suspicious activity on a bluff commanding the shore. Closing in, her crew discovered it was a Turkish defensive position in the course of construction, and Captain Larken gave orders to open fire with one of the ship's main guns. The emplacement was swiftly destroyed.

From Beersheba, Doris proceeded to the Gulf of Alexandretta, where she landed shore parties to disrupt Turkish communication lines, destroying telegraph lines and railway tracks. Anchoring off the harbour of Alexandretta, Larken sent word to the Military Governor of the town demanding that "All munitions of war, mines and locomotives" be handed over to his crew to be destroyed, and that all British and Allied subjects be surrendered to him, along with their families and effects. Failure to comply would result in the town being shelled.

The Governor communicated with Djemal Pasha, Military Commander of Greater Syria, who was not a man to be intimidated. Not only did Djemal Pasha refuse the demands, but he threatened that, if Larken opened  fire on Alexandretta, one British captive would be shot for every Ottoman subject killed in the bombardment.

In the event, negotiations were carried out through the American Consul in Alexandretta, and the Turks took the opportunity to evacuate all military stores and equipment from the town, before two railway locomotives were destroyed in a token gesture.Doris continued to patrol the Syrian coast until March 1915, carrying out thirteen landing operations and many coastal bombardments before being relieved by the French.

On 25 April 1915, Doris participated in a shore bombardment near Bulair along the western coast of the Gallipoli peninsula, intended as a diversionary feint for the main troop landings at Cape Helles area. 

From March 1917 to November 1918, she was stationed in India, where she served as a hulk. Doris was sold on February 2, 1919 in Mumbai.

Footnotes

References

 A despatch by Captain Prothero on the Naval Brigade formed by officers on the HMS Doris'' in December 1899, during the Second Boer War, is included in the London Gazette Issue 27178, pages 2125-2127

External links
 

 

Eclipse-class cruisers
Ships built in Barrow-in-Furness
1896 ships